Chinmay Sutar (born 3 May 1997) is an Indian cricketer. In November 2019, he was named in India's squad for the 2019 ACC Emerging Teams Asia Cup in Bangladesh. He made his List A debut for India, against Nepal, in the Emerging Teams Cup on 14 November 2019. He scored a century in just his third List A match and his second innings during the tournament, against Hong Kong.

References

External links
 

1997 births
Living people
Indian cricketers
Place of birth missing (living people)